The men's sanda (as Sanshou) 75 kg competition at the 2010 Asian Games in Guangzhou, China was held from 13 November to 17 November at the Nansha Gymnasium.

A total of nine competitors from nine different countries (NOCs) competed in this event, limited to fighters whose body weight was less than 75 kilograms.

Hamid Reza Gholipour from Iran won the gold medal after beating Ijaz Ahmed of Pakistan in gold medal bout 2–0. The bronze medal was shared by Jiang Chunpeng from China and Magsarjavyn Batjargal of Mongolia. Jiang's defeat to Gholipour in semifinal was the only defeat of Chinese wushu athletes in sanda competitions at the 2010 Asian Games, and their first defeat since 2002 Asian Games, Gholipour won that semifinal bout 2–1 in three rounds.

Athletes from Afghanistan, Malaysia, Nepal and Turkmenistan shared the fifth place.

Schedule
All times are China Standard Time (UTC+08:00)

Results
Legend
AV — Absolute victory

References

External links
Official website

Men's sanda 75 kg